Geoff Ward may refer to:

 Geoff Ward (academic) (born 1954), British academic specializing in American literature
 Geoff Ward (cricketer) (1926–2008), English cricketer
 Geoff Ward (footballer) (born 1946), Australian rules footballer
 Geoff Ward (ice hockey) (born 1962), ice hockey coach
 Geoffrey C. Ward (born 1940), American editor, author, historian and scriptwriter
 Geoffrey Ward (rugby league), rugby league footballer of the 1950s and 1960s

See also
 Jeff Ward (disambiguation)